The Pride of the Family is a 30-minute American television situation comedy that was broadcast on ABC from October 2, 1953, until September 24, 1954. CBS showed reruns of the program in prime time in the summer of 1955.

Premise 
Albie Morrison headed a newspaper's advertising department and was head of a family that included his wife, Catherine; teenage daughter, Ann; and son, Junior.

Cast 

 Albie Morrison-Paul Hartman
 Catherine Morrison-Fay Wray
 Ann Morrison-Natalie Wood
 Junior Morrison-Bobby Hyatt

Production 
Sam Perrin was the producer, for Revue Productions. Bob Finkel was the director. Writers included Paul Schneider, Clint Comerford, Fred Howard, Irving Phillips, Al Gordon, Jack Fleischman, and Hal Goldman.

Thirty-nine episodes were filmed in black-and-white with a laugh track. Sponsors included Bufferin pain reliever, Ipana toothpaste, and Dial soap and shampoo.

Reception
A review in TV Guide compared The Pride of the Family to many other situation comedies in that its "situations are contrived to the point of absurdity". The review attributed most of the laughs in the program to Hartman's "wonderfully mobile face" and said that Wray "deserves better" after she came out of retirement to be in this show.

The trade publication Billboard's review of the show's first episode described it as "a rather slow-moving situation comedy series with a competent cast, but only so-so scripting". Although it complimented Wray as "gracious and telegenic" and Hartman as revealing "an unexpected gift for pathos",  it summarized the show overall as "average".

References 

1953 American television series debuts
1954 American television series endings
1950s American television series
American Broadcasting Company original programming
English-language television shows